Oak Hills is an unincorporated community in Monterey County, California. It lies at an elevation of 56 feet (17 m). It is located on California State Route 156 between Castroville and Prunedale.

Notable people
James Holmes, perpetrator of the 2012 Aurora shooting, sentenced to 12 life sentences without parole plus 3,318 years

References

Unincorporated communities in California
Unincorporated communities in Monterey County, California